Niemandsland and Beyond is the second full-length album by South African artist Koos Kombuis. It was released in 1989 by Shifty Records.

Track listing

External links 
 Official Koos Kombuis website

References

1990 albums
Koos Kombuis albums